Fredrik Bergvik (born 14 February 1995) is a Swedish professional ice hockey goaltender. He is currently playing with Södertälje SK team in the Swedish HockeyAllsvenskan (Allsv). He was drafted by the San Jose Sharks in the fourth round (117th overall) of the 2013 NHL Entry Draft.

Bergvik made his SHL debut with Frölunda HC on 26 February 2014, in a game against Örebro HK, in relief of Linus Fernström.

Career statistics

References

External links

1995 births
Frölunda HC players
Living people
Mora IK players
San Jose Sharks draft picks
Södertälje SK players
Swedish ice hockey goaltenders
Ice hockey people from Stockholm